The Pakistan Institute of Engineering & Technology (PIET) is a private institution located in Multan, Punjab, Pakistan. It was established in 2013. It offers undergraduate degree programs in engineering and computer science in affiliation with Bahauddin Zakariya University, Multan . It is also accredited by the Pakistan Engineering Council for engineering programs.

Programs
The college offers following degree programs:

 BS Computer Science
 BE Civil Engineering
 BE Mechanical Engineering
 BE Electrical Engineering

References

External links 
 PIET official website

Engineering universities and colleges in Pakistan
Private universities and colleges in Punjab, Pakistan
Universities and colleges in Multan
Educational institutions established in 2013
2013 establishments in Pakistan